Gareth James Hopkins (born 24 November 1976) is a former New Zealand cricketer. A wicket-keeper, he played five One Day Internationals in 2004 after Brendon McCullum went home from England for the NatWest series.

International career
Gareth Hopkins returned to the international scene playing two matches in the Chappell–Hadlee one day series. The second match of the series and Hopkins' first was heavily rain affected, New Zealand reaching 3/30 when the game came to a close. The second and final match was won by Australia by a convincing 114 runs, Hopkins contributing 9 off 17 balls.

Hopkins made his test debut on 5 June 2008 against England at Trent Bridge, as usual Wicket-keeper Brendon McCullum played in a specialist batsman role. He contributed a total of 27 runs and took 3 catches in New Zealand's innings defeat.

Domestic career
In the summer of 2007/08, he transferred from Otago to Auckland citing the fact that Otago had recruited Brendon McCullum from Canterbury. The move was surprising considering Hopkins scored 5 1st class hundreds for Otago in the summer of 2006/07.

External links

 
 

1976 births
Living people
New Zealand cricketers
New Zealand Test cricketers
New Zealand One Day International cricketers
New Zealand Twenty20 International cricketers
Auckland cricketers
Northern Districts cricketers
Canterbury cricketers
Otago cricketers
Cricketers from Lower Hutt
South Island cricketers
North Island cricketers
Wicket-keepers